People bearing Bagal surname are;

 Madhavrao Bagal (1895–1986), Indian social activist and artist
Jogesh Chandra Bagal (1903–1972), Indian journalist, historian and writer
Monalisa Bagal, Indian film actress
 Arunrao shriram Bagal (politician from partur taluka Dist jalna)
Late. Digambar Bagal (ex MLA from Karmala district Nationalist Congress Party)
Shamal Bagal (ex MLA from Karmala district Nationalist Congress Party)
Rashmi Bagal-Kolte (Politician from Karmala)
Bhimrao R. Bagal (Freedom Fighter from Gadegaon, Pandharpur)
Chandrakant P. Bagal (Politician from Gadegaon, Pandharpur)
Krishnarao Mahadeo Bagal (Ex. Principal District Judge)
Ganesh Bagal (Noted Photographer)

Surnames